The mangrove cuckoo (Coccyzus minor) is a species of cuckoo that is native to the Neotropics.

Taxonomy
The mangrove cuckoo was formally described in 1788 by the German naturalist Johann Friedrich Gmelin in his revised and expanded edition of Carl Linnaeus's Systema Naturae. He placed it with all the other cuckoos in the genus Cuculus and coined the binomial name Cuculus minor. Gmelin based his description on "Le petit vieillard" or "Coucou des palétuviers" from Cayenne that had been described and illustrated in 1779 by the French polymath Georges-Louis Leclerc, Comte de Buffon. The mangrove cuckoo is now placed with 12 other species in the genus Coccyzus that was introduced in 1816 by the French ornithologist Louis Jean Pierre Vieillot. The genus name is from the Ancient Greek kokkuzō meaning "to cry cuckoo". The species is monotypic: no subspecies are recognised.

Description
Adults have a long tail, brown above and black-and-white below, and a black curved bill with yellow on the lower mandible. The head and upper parts are brown. There is a yellow ring around the eye. This bird is best distinguished by its black facial mask and buffy underparts. Although the scientific name is minor (meaning "small"), this species is on average the largest of North America's three Coccyzus cuckoos. The most common call is a guttural "gawk gawk gawk gawk gauk gauk". It will also call a single "whit".

Distribution and habitat
The mangrove cuckoo is a resident of southern Florida in the United States, the Caribbean, both coasts of Mexico and Central America, and the Atlantic coast of South America as far south as the mouth of the Amazon River. It is found primarily in mangrove swamps and hammocks. The mangrove cuckoo is generally fairly common in its specialized range.  This bird could be threatened by human development of mangrove habitat.

Behaviour and ecology

Breeding
The clutch is usually two eggs. These are white and measure . Both parents bring food to the chicks.

Food and feeding
It prefers caterpillars and  grasshoppers, but will also take other insects, insect larvae, spiders, snails, small lizards, bird eggs, nestlings of small birds, and fruit.

References

 "National Geographic"  Field Guide to the Birds of North America 
"National Audubon Society" The Sibley Guide to Birds, by David Allen Sibley,

External links
 UFL.edu: Bird sounds of the Mangrove Cuckoo

Coccyzus
Birds of the Caribbean
Birds of Central America
Mangrove fauna
Birds of the Bahamas
Birds of the Guianas
Birds of Mexico
Birds of Puerto Rico
Birds of the Dominican Republic
Birds of Haiti
Native birds of the Southeastern United States
Birds described in 1788
Taxa named by Johann Friedrich Gmelin